Max Rubner (2 June 1854, Munich27 April 1932, Berlin) was a German physiologist and hygienist.

Academic career 
He studied at the University of Munich and worked as an assistant under Adolf von Baeyer and Carl von Voit (doctorate 1878). Later on, he taught as a professor at the University of Marburg (1885–1891), and in 1891 succeeded Robert Koch as a professor of hygiene at the University of Berlin. In 1909 he succeeded Theodor Wilhelm Engelmann as chair of physiology at Berlin. Rubner was co-founder of the Kaiser-Wilhelm Institut für Arbeitsphysiologie, and became its director in 1913. With his assistant Gerhard Albrecht, Rubner set out to study labour not just as the expenditure of energy, but also the use of intellect. They rejected taylorism as being over concerned with economic outputs, but rather advocated an approach which was more concerned with a biophysical approach to the elimination of fatigue.

Contributions 
Rubner is remembered for his research in metabolism, energy physiology, hygiene and dietary thermogenesis. His best-known research centres on what he termed the "isodynamic law" of calories (demonstrated in 1873, and published a decade later), according to which the form of human calorie intake is irrelevant to its effect on  energy balance, often paraphrased as "a calorie is a calorie". In 1902, Rubner expressed his belief that this was over-simplistic, stating "the effect of specific nutritional substances upon the glands" may modify the effect of specific foods on energy balance, a view that is now increasingly accepted. With Otto Heubner (1843–1926), he performed important studies involving energy metabolism in infancy.

In 1883 Rubner introduced the "surface hypothesis", which stated that the metabolic rate of birds and mammals that maintain a steady body temperature is roughly proportional to their body surface area.

Max Rubner is also known for his "rate-of-living theory", which proposed that a slow metabolism increases an animal's longevity. His observation was that larger animals outlived smaller animals and that the metabolic rates of larger animals were slower pro rata. The theory might have been inspired by the Industrial Revolution by the logic that the more a machine is worked, the sooner it will wear out.

References

Further reading

External links 
 Rubner, Max (1854–1932) -- from Eric Weisstein's World of Scientific Biography at scienceworld.wolfram.com
 Short biography and bibliography in the Virtual Laboratory of the Max Planck Institute for the History of Science
 
 Animal Physiology, Energetics and Metabolism

1854 births
1932 deaths
German physiologists
Hygienists
Physicians from Munich
Ludwig Maximilian University of Munich alumni
Academic staff of the Humboldt University of Berlin
Academic staff of the University of Marburg
Foreign associates of the National Academy of Sciences
Max Planck Institute directors